Jansen Spencer (born 25 May 1981) is an Australian actor best known for his part in the worldwide Australian Soap, Neighbours. Jansen Spencer played Paul McClain between the years of 1997 to 2001. Originally slated for only a few guest appearances, he proved so popular they kept him on as a regular.

Jansen also did a few pantomime performances in the UK after his departure from Neighbours. In 2005, Jansen filmed a cameo for the 20th Anniversary episode of Neighbours.

Filmography
The Flying Doctors" (1987) (TV guest appearance)
Skippy (1996) (TV series)
Newly Weds (1997) (TV guest appearance)
Neighbours (1997–2001; 2005) (TV series) Paul McClain
Winners and Losers (2010)

External links

Australian male television actors
1981 births
Australian male child actors
Living people